George Schaefer  (1928 – 2013) was an American businessman who was CEO of Caterpillar Inc., a US-based construction equipment company.

Schaefer graduated from Saint Louis University in 1951 to begin his career at Caterpillar, where he spent the next 39 years. Schaefer rose to the position of chairman and CEO of the company in 1985 up until 1990 when he retired.

George Schaefer took over Caterpillar during troubled times: as the company's losses mounted to nearly US$1 billion, strikes were prevalent at most of its plants across America, and foreign competition was becoming very strong. In 1985, he began the transformation of Caterpillar through a number of cost-cutting efforts, most notably outsourcing production offshore. Schaefer moved away from a centralized business model by implementing a number different programs that he had previously designed: venture capital, financial services, and product development. This structure that Schaefer created still remains in place today for the company. Schaefer was also responsible for changing the company name from Caterpillar Tractor Co. to Caterpillar Inc. The transformation that Schaefer led while chairman drove Caterpillar from losses and uncertain times to achieving exponential profits and global growth.

Schaefer was appointed to Ronald Reagan's advisory committee for Trade Negotiations in April 1987.

References 

Chicago Tribune
New York Times
Ronald Reagan Presidential Library and Museum
ENR
Peoria Journal Star
Caterpillar
LA Times

External links 
 Former Caterpillar chairman George Schaefer dies at 84
 Caterpillar | Caterpillar Visitors Center Debuts Leadership Moments Video of George Schaefer
 Caterpillar's New Driver: George a. Schaefer; Heavy Cost-Cutter with a Light Touch
 Appointment of Twelve Members of the Advisory Committee for Trade Negotiations | Ronald Reagan Presidential Library - National Archives and Records Administration
 George Schaefer, 84, Who Led a 1980s Caterpillar Transformation, Is Dead
 Former Caterpillar chairman George Schaefer dies at 84
 Caterpillar | Caterpillar Visitors Center Debuts Leadership Moments Video of George Schaefer
 Schaefer Elected Chairman of Caterpillar Tractor Co.
 SCHAEFER TO DRIVE CATERPILLAR

American chief executives of Fortune 500 companies
Saint Louis University alumni
Caterpillar Inc. people